The 2017 Parramatta Eels season is the 71st in the club's history. Coached by Brad Arthur and co-captained by Tim Mannah and Beau Scott, they are competing in the NRL's 2017 Telstra Premiership.

Summary
Parramatta started the 2017 season off with victories over Manly and St. George Illawarra before succumbing to four straight losses. In the Easter Monday game against the Wests Tigers, Parramatta trailed the game 16-10 but came back in the second half to win 26-22. At the midway point of the season, Parramatta sat ninth on the table before going on to win nine of their next ten matches to finish fourth and qualify for their first finals series since 2009. The club would go into the finals series without Clinton Gutherson and Bevan French who both suffered season ending injuries.

In week one of the finals, Parramatta narrowly lost 18-16 to Minor Premiers Melbourne in a controversial match at AAMI Park with Melbourne scoring two questionable tries which were not checked by the NRL bunker. With 30 seconds remaining, Melbourne player Will Chambers performed what seemed to be a voluntary tackle which was not penalised by the referee which would have given Parramatta a chance at a penalty goal right in front of the posts to make it 18-18. In week two of the finals, Parramatta hosted North Queensland who had only qualified for the finals due to St. George Illawarra failing to win their final regular season match. North Queensland were also depleted by injuries with star players Johnathan Thurston and Matthew Scott being ruled out. Parramatta held a 10-6 lead at half-time but suffered a second half capitulation losing 24-16 which ended their season.

Squad information

 This section lists players who were in Parramatta's first grade squad at any point during the 2017 season
 Asterisks indicates player left mid-season
 Caret symbol indicates player joined mid-season
 Hash symbol indicates player retired mid-season

Transfers

In:

Out:

Auckland Nines

Pool table

Bracket

Matches

Pre-season

Home and away season

League table

Result by round

Matches

Finals series

Bracket

Matches

Representative call-ups

Domestic

International

References

Parramatta Eels seasons
Parramatta Eels season